Nydia Eileen Westman (February 19, 1902 – May 23, 1970) was an American actress and singer of stage, screen, and television.

Early years
Westman's parents, Theodore and Lily (Wren) Westman were active in vaudeville in her native New York City. In addition to their working together on stage, her mother was a writer and her father was a composer. She attended the Professional Children's School. Until 1921, she performed on stage only with her family.

Career
Westman's career ranged from episodic appearances on TV series such as That Girl and Dragnet and uncredited bit roles in movies to appearances in films such as Craig's Wife, which starred Rosalind Russell, and the first film version of Little Women.

Westman's screen debut came in Strange Justice (1932). She appeared in 31 films in the 1930s.

She appeared as the housekeeper Mrs. Featherstone in the 1962–1963 ABC series, Going My Way, which starred Gene Kelly and Leo G. Carroll as Roman Catholic priests in New York City.

Westman's first Broadway play was Pigs (1924); her last was Midgie Purvis (1961).

Personal life 
Westman was married to Robert Sparks, a producer, from 1930 until 1937; they had a daughter, actress Kate Williamson.

Death 
Westman died of cancer at the age of 68 in Burbank, California. She was buried at Oakwood Memorial Park Cemetery in Chatsworth, California.

Selected filmography

Television work

References

External links

FilmsAndTV bio

1902 births
1970 deaths
American film actresses
American stage actresses
American television actresses
Actresses from New York City
People from Greater Los Angeles
Deaths from cancer in California
Obie Award recipients
Singers from New York City
20th-century American actresses
20th-century American singers
20th-century American women singers